Lake Ancascocha (possibly from Quechua anqas blue, qucha lake) is a lake in Peru located in the Ayacucho Region, Lucanas Province, Chaviña District, and in the Parinacochas Province, Coracora District.

The Ancascocha Dam was erected at the southern end of the lake.

See also
List of lakes in Peru

References

Lakes of Peru
Lakes of Ayacucho Region
Dams in Peru
Buildings and structures in Ayacucho Region